Kerlyson Viana de Moraes (born 4 January 1996), commonly known as Kerlyson, is a Brazilian footballer who plays for Maranhão.

Career statistics

Club

Notes

References

1994 births
Living people
Brazilian footballers
Association football defenders
Botafogo de Futebol e Regatas players
Bangu Atlético Clube players
Maranhão Atlético Clube players
Footballers from Rio de Janeiro (city)